In abstract algebra, the fundamental theorem on homomorphisms, also known as the fundamental homomorphism theorem, or the first isomorphism theorem, relates the structure of two objects between which a homomorphism is given, and of the kernel and image of the homomorphism.

The homomorphism theorem is used to prove the isomorphism theorems.

Group theoretic version 

Given two groups G and H and a group homomorphism ,  let N be a normal subgroup in G and φ the natural surjective homomorphism  (where G/N is the quotient group of G by N). If N is a subset of ker(f) then there exists a unique homomorphism  such that .

In other words, the natural projection φ is universal among homomorphisms on G that map N to the identity element.

The situation is described by the following commutative diagram:

h is injective if and only if . Therefore, by setting  we immediately get the first isomorphism theorem.

We can write the statement of the fundamental theorem on homomorphisms of groups as "every homomorphic image of a group is isomorphic to a quotient group".

Other versions 
Similar theorems are valid for monoids, vector spaces, modules, and rings.

See also
 Quotient category

References
.
.
.
.

Theorems in abstract algebra